Göyyal (also, Goyyal and Gëyyal) is a village in the Qubadli Rayon of Azerbaijan.
Göyyal is the Azeri village in Qubadli

References 

Populated places in Qubadli District